Rose Pugliese is a state representative from El Paso County, Colorado. A Republican, Pugliese represents Colorado House of Representatives District 14, which, after 2020 reapportionment, encompasses northern El Paso County, including much of the city of Colorado Springs.

Background
Pugliese is an attorney. She earned a bachelor's degree from Villanova University and a Juris Doctor degree from St. John's University School of Law.

Political career 
Pugliese served two terms as a county commissioner in Mesa County, Colorado from 2013 to 2021. She moved from Mesa County to Colorado Springs in late 2020. In the 2023–2024 General Assembly session, Pugliese serves as assistant minority leader.

Elections
In the 2022 Colorado House of Representatives election, Pugliese defeated her Democratic Party opponent, winning 27,250 votes (60.67%) to her opponent's 17,665 votes (39.33%).

References

External links
 Legislative website
 Campaign website

21st-century American politicians
Living people
Women state legislators in Colorado
Politicians from Colorado Springs, Colorado
County commissioners in Colorado
Year of birth missing (living people)
Villanova University alumni
St. John's University School of Law alumni
Republican Party members of the Colorado House of Representatives
21st-century American women politicians